Erika Endriss (born 30 August 1954) is a German rower. She competed in the women's eight event at the 1976 Summer Olympics.

References

1954 births
Living people
German female rowers
Olympic rowers of West Germany
Rowers at the 1976 Summer Olympics
Sportspeople from Stuttgart